Archibald Alexander Hodge (July 18, 1823 – November 12, 1886), an American Presbyterian leader, was the principal of Princeton Seminary between 1878 and 1886.

Biography
He was born on July 18, 1823 to Sarah and Charles Hodge in Princeton, New Jersey.  He was named after Charles' mentor, the first principal of Princeton Seminary, Archibald Alexander.
 
Hodge attended the College of New Jersey (later Princeton University) in 1841 and then Princeton Theological Seminary in 1847.

He served as a missionary in India for three years (1847–1850). He held pastorates at Lower West Nottingham, Maryland (1851–1855), Fredericksburg, Virginia (1855–1861), and Wilkes-Barre, Pennsylvania (1861–1864). In 1864 he accepted a call to the chair of systematic theology in Western Theological Seminary (later Pittsburgh Theological Seminary) in Pittsburgh, Pennsylvania. There he remained until in 1877 he was called to Princeton to be the associate of his father, Charles Hodge, in the distinguished chair of systematic theology. He took on the full responsibilities of the chair of systematic theology in 1878.

He died on November 12, 1886 in Princeton, New Jersey from "a severe cold ... which settled in his kidneys".

Influence
At the time of his death, he was a trustee of the College of New Jersey and a leader in the Presbyterian Church. His interests extended beyond religion. He touched the religious world at many points. During the years immediately preceding his death he did not slacken his work, but continued his work of writing, preaching, lecturing, making addresses, coming into contact with men, influencing them, and by doing so widening the influence of Christianity. Among the most influential was an article titled Inspiration that began a series in the Presbyterian Review which established the discipline of biblical theology as a historical science. This article was coauthored with B. B. Warfield in 1880.

Characteristics

Hodge's distinguishing characteristic as a theologian was his power as a thinker. He had a mind of singular acuteness, and though never a professed student of metaphysics, he was essentially and by nature a metaphysician. His theology was that of the Reformed confessions. He had no peculiar views and no peculiar method of organizing theological dogmas; in this he may be identified with his father, who claimed at the end of his life that he had taught and written nothing new.  Though he taught the same theology that his father had taught before him, he was independent as well as reverent. His first book and that by which he is best known was his Outlines of Theology (New York City, 1860; enlarged ed., 1878; reprinted 1996), which was translated into Welsh, modern Greek, and Hindustani. The Atonement (Philadelphia, 1867; reprinted 1989) is still one of the best treatises on the subject. This was followed by his commentary on the Westminster Confession of Faith (1869), a very useful book, full of clear thinking and compact statement. He contributed some important articles to encyclopedias – Johnson's, McClintock and Strong's, and the Schaff-Herzog (the Schaff-Herzog encyclopedia furnished the kernel from which this article developed). He was one of the founders of the Presbyterian Review, to the pages of which he was a frequent contributor.

Sermons

In the pulpit, Hodge had few sermons, and he preached them frequently. They were never written nor deliberately planned. They grew from small beginnings and, as he went through the process of thinking them over as often as he preached them, they gradually became more elaborate.

Publications
The Rule of Faith and Practice
The Protestant rule of faith
The Rules of Interpreting Scripture
The Holy Scriptures - Canon and Inspiration (Part 1) (Part 2)
The Inspiration of the Bible
Commentary on the Westminster Confession of Faith
God - His Nature And Relation To The Universe
Assurance and Humility
A Short History of Creeds and Confessions
God's Covenants With Man--The Church
Baptism
The Mode of Baptism
Sanctification (revised by B.B. Warfield)
Free Will
Outlines of Theology
Justification (Part 1) (Part 2) (Part 3)
Predestination
Selected Essays by Archibald Alexander Hodge
A commentary on the Confession of Faith : with questions for theological students and Bible classes 
(1869) https://archive.org/details/commentaryonconf00hodguoft (Robarts - University of Toronto)
(1869) https://archive.org/details/acommentaryonthe00hodguoft (Knox - University of Toronto)
(1869) https://archive.org/details/commentaryonconf00hodg (Princeton Theological Seminary Library)
(1901 printing) https://archive.org/details/commentaryonconf1901hodg (Princeton Theological Seminary Library)
A commentary on the confession of faith [of the Assembly of divines] ed. by W.H. Goold (1870)
https://archive.org/details/acommentaryonco00hodggoog (Oxford University)
Comentario de la Confesion de fe de Westminster de la Iglesia Presbiteriana (1897)
https://archive.org/details/comentariodelaco00hodg (Princeton Theological Seminary Library)
The atonement (1867)
(1867) https://archive.org/details/theatonement00hodguoft (Trinity College - University of Toronto)
(1867) https://archive.org/details/atonement00hodguoft    (Robarts - University of Toronto)
(1867) https://archive.org/details/atonement00publgoog    (New York Public Library)
(1867) https://archive.org/details/atonement00hodg        (New York Public Library)
Outlines of theology 
(1860) https://archive.org/details/outlinesoftheolo1860hodg   (Princeton Theological Seminary Library)
(1861) https://archive.org/details/outlinesoftheolo00hodg     (Princeton Theological Seminary Library)
(1863) https://archive.org/details/outlinestheolog03hodggoog  (Harvard University)
(1863) (ed. by W.H. Goold)  https://archive.org/details/outlinestheolog01hodggoog (Oxford University)
(1865) https://archive.org/details/outlinesoftheolo1865hodg   (Princeton Theological Seminary Library)
(1866) https://archive.org/details/outlinestheolog02hodggoog  (unknown library)
(1876) https://archive.org/details/outlinesoftheo00hodg       (New York Public Library)
(1877) https://archive.org/details/outlinesoftheolo00hodguoft (Emmanuel - University of Toronto)
(1878) https://archive.org/details/outlinesoftheolo1878hodg   (Princeton Theological Seminary Library)
(1879) https://archive.org/details/outlinesoftheolo1879hodg   (Princeton Theological Seminary Library)
(1879) (ed. by W.H. Goold) https://archive.org/details/outlinestheolog00hodggoog  (Oxford University)
There is also a companion to this book by William Passmore (1873)A compendium of evangelical theology given in the words of holy Scripture https://archive.org/details/acompendiumevan00unkngoog
The life of Charles Hodge ... professor in the Theological seminary, Princeton, N.J. (1880)
https://archive.org/details/lifeofcharleshodg00hodg    (Princeton Theological Seminary Library)
https://archive.org/details/lifeofcharleshod00hodg0    (Princeton Theological Seminary Library)
https://archive.org/details/lifeofcharlesh00hodg       (Princeton Theological Seminary Library)
https://archive.org/details/lifeofcharleshod00hodgrich (University of California Libraries)
https://archive.org/details/lifecharleshodg01hodggoog  (University of California)
https://archive.org/details/lifecharleshodg02hodggoog  (New York Public Library)
(1881) https://archive.org/details/lifecharleshodg00hodggoog (Oxford University)
Popular lectures on theological themes (1887) 
https://archive.org/details/popularlectures00hodggoog  
https://archive.org/details/popularlectures00publgoog 
https://archive.org/details/popularlectures00hodguoft
https://archive.org/details/popularlectureso00hodg
Inspiration (1881) (Reprinted from the Presbyterian review, April, 1881) https://archive.org/details/inspiration00hodg (Princeton Theological Seminary Library)
Westminster doctrine anent holy scripture : tractates by professors A. A. Hodge and Warfield (1891)
https://archive.org/details/westminsterdoct00howi (Princeton Theological Seminary Library)
Manual of forms for baptism, admission to the communion, administration of the Lord's Supper, marriage and funerals : conformed to the doctrine and discipline of the Presbyterian Church (1877) 
https://archive.org/details/manualofformsfor00hodg
https://archive.org/details/manualofforms00hodg
(1882 copyright, 1883 published) https://archive.org/details/manualofforms00hodguoft (Emmanuel - University of Toronto)
The system of theology contained in the Westminster shorter catechism opened and explained (1888) https://archive.org/details/systemoftheology00hodg
Questions on the text of the Systematic Theology of Dr. Charles Hodge : together with an exhibition of various schemes illustrating the principles of theological construction (by A. A. Hodge)(1885)
https://archive.org/details/questionsontexto00hodg (Princeton Theological Seminary Library)
Address at the funeral of the Rev. Henry Augustus Boardman, D.D. (1881)
https://archive.org/details/addressatfuneral00hodg (Princeton Theological Seminary Library)
Van Dyke, Joseph Smith (1886) Theism and evolution : an examination of modern speculative theories as related to theistic conceptions of the universe. With an introduction by d Alexander Hodge 
https://archive.org/details/theismandevolut00vanduoft (Trinity College - University of Toronto)
https://archive.org/details/theismevolutione00vand    (Princeton Theological Seminary Library)

Articles

References

External links

 
 

1823 births
1886 deaths
American Calvinist and Reformed theologians
American Presbyterians
American evangelicals
Princeton Theological Seminary faculty
People from Fredericksburg, Virginia
Presbyterian Church in the United States of America ministers
Christianity in Pittsburgh
Religious leaders from Pittsburgh
Contributors to the Schaff–Herzog Encyclopedia of Religious Knowledge
19th-century Calvinist and Reformed theologians
Presidents of Calvinist and Reformed seminaries
Pittsburgh Theological Seminary faculty
Princeton University alumni
Princeton Theological Seminary alumni
19th-century American clergy